Samuel Nuqingaq is a Canadian, Inuk politician from Qikiqtarjuaq, Nunavut. He was elected to the Legislative Assembly of Nunavut in the 2013 election. He was expelled from the legislature in 2014.

Political career

Election
Nuqinqaq ran for election in the electoral district of Uqqummiut which was one of two ridings to report a tie on election night in the 2013 election. In the original count of the ballots he was tied with Niore Iqalukjuak at 187 votes each. A recount was held November 5, 2013, and Nuqingaq was found to have 187 votes to Iqalukjuak's 185.

Suspension
Nuqingaq was suspended without pay from the legislature, including all caucus and committee meetings, on March 6, 2014 until the spring sitting.  Earlier, he had been disciplined for missing two days of orientation and the beginning of the leadership forum.  The suspension was extended through July 16 after being charged with assault and unlawfully being in a dwelling house.  He spent much of the summer in Nova Scotia undergoing treatment for an alcohol addiction before returning to the legislature on September 22.

Expulsion
On 24 October 2014, Nunavut MLAs unanimously passed a motion to expel Nuqingaq, which vacated his seat immediately and forced a by-election. In moving the motion, Justice Minister Paul Okalik claimed that the legislature had spent too much time dealing with Nuqingaq's behaviour, and the public interest demanded his expulsion.  He noted that Nuqingaq had been disciplined for "unacceptable conduct, including persistent absences from sittings of the House and meetings of its committees and caucuses without reasonable explanation."

References

Living people
Members of the Legislative Assembly of Nunavut
21st-century Canadian politicians
Inuit from the Northwest Territories
Inuit politicians
People from Qikiqtarjuaq
People expelled from public office
Inuit from Nunavut
Year of birth missing (living people)